The Cavite–Tagaytay–Batangas Expressway (CTBEX) is a proposed  expressway that will connect the under-construction Cavite–Laguna Expressway (CALAX) in the municipality of Silang, Cavite to J.P. Laurel Street (Ternate–Nasugbu Road) in the municipality of Nasugbu, Batangas, which situated as the western terminus of the expressway.

The objective of the new expressway in Calabarzon region is to decongest the main highway of Tagaytay of heavy traffic due to tourism developments in Tagaytay–Nasugbu area.

History 
First proposed in 2016 as part of Metro Pacific Tollways' plan to spur economic growth in the western part of southern Luzon, the project went under evaluation until the Department of Public Works and Highways (DPWH) awarded the original proponent status to Metro Pacific Tollways South Corporation (MPT South) in July 2018. Metro Pacific expects the Swiss Challenge for this project by end of 2021 or early 2022. It will have eight major interchanges, two spur roads: Tagaytay and a couple of overpasses.

Future exits

References 

Proposed roads in the Philippines
Roads in Cavite
Roads in Batangas
Toll roads in the Philippines